Craig Stapleton (born 31 August 1978) is an Australian former professional rugby league footballer who last played for the South Sydney Rabbitohs in the National Rugby League. A journeyman forward, Stapleton played for eight clubs in twelve years.

Background
Stapleton was born in Sydney, New South Wales, Australia.

Playing career
Stapleton made his first grade debut for St. George against the Gold Coast Chargers in round 11 of the 1998 NRL season which ended in a 30-16 victory.  At the end of 1998, St. George formed a joint-venture with the Illawarra Steelers to form St. George Illawarra as part of the NRL's rationalization policy.

In 2001, Stapleton began playing for St. George Illawarra.  In the 2002 NRL season, he played in the club's elimination final loss against rivals Cronulla-Sutherland.  Stapleton joined Parramatta for the 2004 NRL season as the club finished a disappointing 12th on the table.

Stapleton spent a year in England with Leigh during the 2005 season.  In 2006, he joined Penrith and played 24 games for the club as they missed out on the finals.  He was later released by Penrith and joined Cronulla-Sutherland.  He played 24 games for Cronulla as they finished 11th on the table.

In 2008, Stapleton joined English Super League club Salford.

Return to Australia
Stapleton returned to Australia in 2009 to play in the Illawarra rugby league competition with Wests and was called up by South Sydney Rabbitohs in 2010 due to the number of injuries they had in the forwards. For the 2019 Group 7 Rugby League season, Stapleton was named head coach of the Warilla Gorillas.

Career highlights
First Grade Debut: 1998 - Round 11, St. George vs Gold Coast Chargers at Gold Coast Stadium, 23 May
Salford's Player of the Year in 2008 & 2009

Footnotes

External links

NRL Player Profile

1978 births
Living people
Australian rugby league players
Australian expatriate sportspeople in England
Cronulla-Sutherland Sharks players
Leigh Leopards players
North Sydney Bears NSW Cup players
Parramatta Eels players
Penrith Panthers players
Prime Minister's XIII players
Rugby league players from Sydney
Rugby league props
Rugby league second-rows
Salford Red Devils players
South Sydney Rabbitohs players
St. George Dragons players
St. George Illawarra Dragons players